The Best of Franciscus Henri is a children's album released in 2002, under ABC Music's ABC For Kids label on compact disc.

Track listing
 "White Pyjamas" (F. Henri)
 "Zoo in My House" (S. Browne)
 "Taking Us to The Carnival" (F. Henri)
 "Five Coconuts" (F. Henri)
 "Baked Beans" (F. Henri)
 "Walking on The Milkyway" (F. Henri)
 "Little Red Car Song" (F. Henri)
 "Happy, Sad Song" (I.Catchlove - F. Henri)
 "Give My Things Back" (F. Henri)
 "Doctor, Doctor" (F. Henri)
 "Dancing in The Kitchen" (F. Henri)
 "Five Current Buns" (F. Henri)
 "Silly Billy" (F. Henri)
 "I’m Hans Christian Andersen"
 "Bag of Lollies" (F. Henri)
 "Three Little Sparrows" (F. Henri)
 "Piggy on The Railway" (trad - F. Henri)
 "Bessie The Steam Train" (I.Catchlove - F. Henri)
 "Old Tin Can" (F. Henri)

2002 compilation albums
Franciscus Henri albums